Pazinotus is a genus of sea snails, marine gastropod mollusks in the subfamily Muricopsinae  of the family Muricidae, the murex snails or rock snails.

Species
Species within the genus Pazinotus include:

 Pazinotus advenus Poorman, 1980
 Pazinotus bodarti (Santos Costa, 1993)
 Pazinotus bowdenensis (Vokes, 1970)
 Pazinotus brevisplendoris (Houart, 1985)
 Pazinotus chionodes Houart & Héros, 2012
 Pazinotus falcatiformis (Thiele, 1925)
 Pazinotus gili Costa & Pimenta, 2012
 Pazinotus goesi Houart, 2006
 Pazinotus kilburni (Houart, 1987)
 Pazinotus sibogae (Schepman, 1911)
 Pazinotus smithi (Schepman, 1911)
 Pazinotus spectabilis Houart, 1991
 Pazinotus stimpsonii (Dall, 1889)
Species brought into synonymy
 Pazinotus oliverae [sic]: synonym of Pazinotus oliverai (Kosuge, 1984): synonym of Paziella oliverai (Kosuge, 1984): synonym of Flexopteron oliverai (Kosuge, 1984) (incorrect gender ending)
 Pazinotus oliverai (Kosuge, 1984): synonym of Paziella oliverai (Kosuge, 1984): synonym of Flexopteron oliverai (Kosuge, 1984)

References

 
Muricopsinae